Bottles is a 1936 Happy Harmonies animated cartoon directed by Hugh Harman and produced by Rudolf Ising for the Metro-Goldwyn-Mayer cartoon studio.

Plot
On a dark and stormy night, an elderly pharmacist falls asleep at his stool while mixing poisonous chemicals in a glass bottle. After he falls asleep, the night takes a sudden fantastical turn as his poisonous bottle—topped with a "skull and crossbones" stopper as a warning label—suddenly springs to life, becoming a malevolent cackling skeleton. Laughing evilly, and screaming "Death walks tonight!", the skeleton douses the pharmacist with chemicals that mysteriously cause him to shrink.

Waking up, the pharmacist sets out to explore his store in his new minuscule form and finds that all of the bottles in the pharmacy have similarly sprung to life, with most of them taking on colorful personalities based on their contents: three baby bottles become a trio of crying babies, a bottle of Scotch whiskey becomes a jolly Scotsman (married to the bottle of rum that sits next to him), a bottle of Absorbine and Absorbine Jr. become a father and son, a container of vanishing cream playfully vanishes and reappears, a bottle of smelling salts sniffs everyone in close proximity, and a bottle of India ink takes the form of an Indian snake charmer—charming a tube of "Cobra Toothpaste" that becomes a live snake.

With the evil skeleton nowhere in sight, the pharmacist joins the bottles in their merriment as they all begin to sing, dance and frolic in turn: three bottles of Cuban rum sing a Spanish song, a pair of rubber gloves spring to life and tap-dance, a bottle of Carmencita-brand powder and a bottle of toilet water dance a flamenco dance, a pair of salt shakers come to life as Dutch children and go ice-skating on a mirror while a bottle of talcum powder drops imaginary snow on them, a bottle of shaving cream happily takes up a shaving razor, and the pharmacist finally takes up a smoking pipe and begins playing it like a tuba.

But all is not well in the pharmacy, as the skeleton has secretly formed an alliance with a small cadre of evil bottles that inhabit the darker corners of the shelves: a bottle of witch hazel springs to life as an old witch, and several bottles of spirits of ammonia open up to release a trio of mischievous singing ghosts. As the witch and the skeleton mix a poisonous brew in the pharmacist's beakers and test tubes, the ghosts fly out to snatch up the pharmacist and bring him back to the skeleton. As the skeleton cackles triumphantly, the ghosts hurl the pharmacist into the glass distiller as it bubbles with chemicals. Helpless, the pharmacist is sent hurtling through the twisting tubes of his distiller, chased and ground up in a mincer (which splits him up into tiny duplicates of himself), only to be hurled back into the distiller after the skeleton sucks him up in a syringe. After sending him through the distiller twice, the skeleton finally traps the pharmacist in a glass beaker, laughing as he ties him up with rubber tubing and attacks him with a pair of scissors, threatening to snip him in half.

Finally, when the pharmacist's death seems certain, he wakes up at his stool, unharmed and back to his normal size. Looking to his bottle of poisonous chemicals, the pharmacist realizes that he had merely been having a nightmare, and laughs in relief.

Characters
The Pharmacist is an old and ancient man who is working late making some magical chemicals, liquids and potions around the interior of the old, and vintage apothecary building with windows, top and glass bottom shelves, and a table with a stool.

This may have been the first cartoon short to utilize a character named Witch-Hazel, which would give way to other characters with similar names created by Walt Disney Productions and Warner Bros. Cartoons.

Trivia
There have been suggestions that Ian Anderson of Jethro Tull, when writing the opening riff to "Aqualung" (1971) might have been subconsciously influenced by the "Spirits of Ammonia" song about 7:45 into the Bottles cartoon.

References

External links
 

1936 films
Metro-Goldwyn-Mayer animated short films
Films directed by Hugh Harman
1930s American animated films
Films scored by Scott Bradley
Happy Harmonies
1930s English-language films